The Proposal is a collaborative studio album by producer/DJ Statik Selektah and the American rapper, Ransom. The project was finished within four days. The album features guest appearances from Easy Money, Styles P, and Termanology.

Critical response

The Proposal was met with generally positive reviews from music critics.

Track listing
All songs produced by Statik Selektah.

References

External links
Thesource.com
Thewordisbond.com
Showoffhiphop.com

2013 albums
Albums produced by Statik Selektah
Collaborative albums